The Journal of Investment Management (JOIM) is a quarterly refereed journal which seeks to be a nexus of theory and practice of investment management. The Journal of Investment Management offers in-depth research with practical significance utilising concepts from the economics and accounting disciplines. The editor is Gifford H. Fong, founder of Gifford Fong Associates, a boutique bond and equity analysis firm.

The journal is published by Stallion Press and has an ISSN of 1545-9144.

References

External links
JOIM

Economics journals
Finance journals
English-language journals
Publications established in 2003
Quarterly journals